Jeff Sipe (born January 31, 1959), also known as Apt. Q258, is an American drummer. He is a rock and jazz fusion drummer but is proficient in other styles. He is a founding member of Aquarium Rescue Unit with Bruce Hampton. He was a member of Leftover Salmon and the Zambiland Orchestra, an experimental big band with members of Phish and Widespread Panic. He has toured with Trey Anastasio, Jeff Coffin,  Jimmy Herring, Warren Haynes, and Keller Williams.

Discography

As leader or co-leader
 Art of the Jam (Dynasonic, 2005)
 Cosmic Farm (Tone Center, 2005)
 Timeless (Blues Planet, 2006)
 Duet with Jeff Coffin (Compass, 2011) 
 Jeff Sipe Trio (Abstract Logix, 2014)

With Aquarium Rescue Unit
 1992 Col. Bruce Hampton & the Aquarium Rescue Unit
 1993 Mirrors of Embarrassment
 1994 eeePee
 1994 In a Perfect World
 2007 Warren Haynes Presents: The Benefit Concert, Vol. 2

As member
 1999 Laughing Water, Jazz Is Dead
 1999 The Nashville Sessions, Leftover Salmon
 2001 Project Z, Project Z
 2006 Lincoln Memorial, Project Z

As guest
With Jeff Coffin
 2011 Jeff Coffin & the Mutet – Live!
 2011 Duet
 2006 Bloom

With Jonas Hellborg
 1996 Temporal Analogues of Paradise 
 1997 Time Is the Enemy 
 1999 Zenhouse 
 2002 Personae

With Susan Tedeschi
 2002 Wait for Me
 2004 Live from Austin TX
 2008 Back to the River

With Keller Williams
 2007 12
 2007 Dream
 2008 Live

With others
 1987 Arkansas, Bruce Hampton
 1994 Cedell Davis, CeDell Davis
 1999 Beauty and the Bloodsucker, Eugene Chadbourne
 2003 The Grease Factor, Shane Theriot
 2003 Warren Haynes Presents: The Benefit Concert Vol. 2, Gov't Mule
 2004 Joseph Patrick Moore's Drum & Bass Society Vol.1, Joseph Patrick Moore
 2007 Improvision, Alex Machacek
 2008 Lifeboat, Jimmy Herring
 2008 Long Road, Drew Emmitt
 2008 Original Boardwalk Style: Live in Atlantic City, Trey Anastasio
 2009 Official Triangle Sessions, Alex Machacek
 2012 Subject to Change Without Notice, Jimmy Herring
 2013 Beyond the Ragasphere, Debashish Bhattacharya
 2013 Tell the Ones I Love, Steep Canyon Rangers
2017 Live in San Francisco, John McLaughlin & the 4th Dimension/ Jimmy Herring & the Invisible Whip

References

External links
Official site

1959 births
Living people
American rock drummers
Musicians from Berlin
20th-century American drummers
American male drummers
20th-century American male musicians
Leftover Salmon members
Col. Bruce Hampton and the Aquarium Rescue Unit members
Jazz Is Dead members